Days of Purgatory is a heavy metal album by Iced Earth. It is a collection of remixes and remakes from previous albums, with the exception of their then-recent record The Dark Saga. Most of the songs from the Enter the Realm EP, Iced Earth, and Night of the Stormrider were re-sung by Matt Barlow, and on some of the songs the drums and bass were redone. The 2-CD version also has rough mixes of several songs from Burnt Offerings with the opening to the title track re-recorded. The album cover features artwork of the Chaos Comics character Purgatori.

The reason for the album was to improve the original songs, create nostalgia for older fans and introduce newer fans to Iced Earth's older work.  The 2-CD limited edition was originally produced for European audiences but has since been released in the United States. Days of Purgatory was the last new release from the band featuring longtime guitarist Randall Shawver, and the first to feature bassist James MacDonough and drummer Brent Smedley.

The song "Written on the Walls" from the band's self titled album was given completely new lyrics and renamed "Cast in Stone". The only songs left unrecorded from the band's first albums were "Mystical End", "The Path I Choose", and "Curse the Sky", though the latter two were both performed live with Barlow on vocals. "Winter Nights" was recorded during early sessions for Night of the Stormrider while Gene Adam was still on vocals, but this was the track which prompted Schaffer to ask Adam to get singing lessons, as it was felt he could not handle the high notes. Therefore, the song was not used on the album due to its acrimonious history, though it would have fit in with the storyline of the album. Live performances of this song from that era (such as Wuppertal '91) show him struggling to sing it, probably contributing to his dismissal. Schaffer eventually dug the song out of the vaults to use on this album with Barlow providing vocals, but, as mentioned in the album's booklet, used a 1986 Purgatory demo for the backing track instead.

Track listing

One CD edition

Two CD edition

Disc one

Disc two

Personnel 
Jon Schaffer – rhythm guitar, vocals
Randall Shawver – lead guitar
Matt Barlow – lead vocals
Brent Smedley – drums on tracks 1,2,5,6,9,21
James MacDonough – bass on 1,2,5,6,9,21
Dave Abell – bass on 3,4,7,8,10-20
Mike McGill – drums on 10,11,13,16
Richey Secchiari – drums on 3,4,7,8,14,18,19
Rodney Beasley – drums on 12,15,17,20

Additional personnel
Howard Helm – keyboards
Kent Smith – keyboards

References 

1997 compilation albums
1997 remix albums
Iced Earth compilation albums
Albums recorded at Morrisound Recording